The Footballer of the Year of Ivory Coast is a yearly award given by the Ivorian Football Federation to the best player of the year.

Winners
All players and clubs are Ivorian, unless otherwise noted.

References

Football in Ivory Coast
Annual events in Ivory Coast
Ivorian awards
2006 establishments in Ivory Coast